Attilio Conton (2 September 1902 – 3 November 1997) was an Italian long-distance runner. He competed in the marathon at the 1928 Summer Olympics.

References

External links
 

1902 births
1997 deaths
Athletes (track and field) at the 1928 Summer Olympics
Italian male long-distance runners
Italian male marathon runners
Olympic athletes of Italy
Place of birth missing